Once Sent from the Golden Hall is the debut full-length studio album released by the melodic death metal band Amon Amarth, released by Metal Blade Records and Sony Music on 10 February 1998. The album was originally limited and only 1000 copies were sold on CD and LP versions. Later the album was re-released by Metal Blade in 2005 on Picture LP with 500 hand-counted copies. A deluxe edition was released in 2009 that featured the album remastered by Jens Bogren, and a bonus CD of the original album played live in its entirety in Bochum, Germany. Martin Lopez left the band soon after the release of this album to join Swedish band Opeth, making this the only album with him on drums. Likewise, it is also the only album to feature guitarist Anders Hansson.

Track listing

Personnel

Amon Amarth
Johan Hegg – vocals
Olavi Mikkonen – lead guitar
Anders Hansson – rhythm guitar
Ted Lundström – bass
Martin Lopez – drums

Other
 Engineered by Peter Tägtgren
 Cover by Peter Kinmark

Artwork
The front cover features the band standing in a doorway in front of fire. Johan Hegg has his arms raised with his fists in the air. Four swords (like the ones used to form the 'A A' on the inside flap) border the image. The band's logo sits half an inch above the swords in flaming letters using the band's signature font, below the four swords is the album title. All artwork was created by Peter Kinmark.

References

Amon Amarth albums
Metal Blade Records albums
1998 debut albums
Albums produced by Peter Tägtgren